Moscow United Methodist Church is located in Moscow, Pennsylvania, on Church Street near Main Street. It is a church of the United Methodist Church that operates in the Susquehanna Conference.

They  are a community church ministering and serving the greater North Pocono area for over 150 years.

The church prides itself in keeping its "family" active in Christ's work and in maintaining a friendly and warm atmosphere.

The church is open to anyone to attend a worship service, and to learn, grow and share in God's love for Jesus Christ.  Moscow UMC's hearts, minds and doors are open to all.

Mission statement
To share God's Love in Jesus Christ through word and action so that all would become followers.

Community Programs
 Mondays in Moscow–Music and Arts Programs that are hosted at Moscow UMC once monthly September–May
 Watercolor Workshop-Wednesday Evenings
 North Pocono Ministerium
 Ecumenical Services hosted at various community churches
 Red Cross Blood donation
 Tuesday Evening Line Dancing Classes at the church
 Election Day Dinners
 “BE HEARD” – teen outreach
 Alcoholics Anonymous

Music

Vocal Choirs

 Children's Choir– (K-5th Grades)
 Youth Choir – (6th-12th Grades)
 Adult Choir – (High School-Adult)

Hand-Bell Choirs

 Youth Ringers – (3rd-8th Grades)
 Festival Ringers-(High  School - Adult)

Mission outreach
 North Pocono Food Pantry
 North Pocono Dry Goods Pantry
 Project Joy Christmas Outreach
 Angel Tree Ministry
 Prison Ministry
 Summer Youth Mission Trips
 Volunteers in Mission to Haiti

Bible Studies
The church has a Bible Studies scheduled at various times throughout the year.

Fun Fundraiser, Service, and Fellowship
 Fall Auction
 Spring Sale
 Mystery Dinner Theater
 Wednesday Morning Work Crew

Pastoral Care
 Hospital and Home Visitation
 Pre-Marital Counseling
 Pre-Baptismal Counseling
 Crisis Intervention

References

External links
 
 

Methodist churches in Pennsylvania
Churches in Lackawanna County, Pennsylvania